The Omloop van Oost-Vlaanderen was a post WW II-men's cycling race organized for the last time in 1979. The start and finish place was Ertvelde (East Flanders, Belgium).

The competition's roll of honor includes the successes of Rik Van Looy, Walter Godefroot and Herman Van Springel.

Winners

References 

Cycle races in Belgium
Defunct cycling races in Belgium
1945 establishments in Belgium
Recurring sporting events established in 1945
Recurring sporting events disestablished in 1979
1979 disestablishments